Club Deportivo Defensor Casablanca is a Chilean Football club, their home town is Casablanca, Chile. They currently play in the fifth level of Chilean football, the Tercera División B.

The club were founded on October 17, 1919 and participated for 15 years in Tercera División A and 10 years in Tercera División B.

Seasons played
15 seasons in Tercera División A
11 seasons in Tercera División B

See also
Chilean football league system

References

1919 establishments in Chile
Association football clubs established in 1919
Football clubs in Chile